The Sunset Route is a main line of the Union Pacific Railroad running between Southern California and New Orleans, Louisiana.

The name traces its origins to the Galveston, Harrisburg and San Antonio Railway, a Southern Pacific Railway subsidiary which was known as the Sunset Route as early as 1874. The line was built by several different companies and largely consolidated under Southern Pacific.

Upon Southern Pacific Railroad's merger with Union Pacific in 1996, less than 25% of the route was double-tracked. Efforts to expand double-trackage were ongoing as of the late 2000s and early 2010s, with over seventy percent of the route having two tracks by 2012.

Usage
The line is primarily used for freight by the Union Pacific. BNSF shares ownership of the Lafayette Subdivision. By 2007, 45 trains daily were operating through Maricopa, Arizona. The Amtrak Sunset Limited operates three round-trips weekly over the entirety of the route with the Texas Eagle attached between San Antonio and Los Angeles.

Subdivisions

The Union Pacific has divided the Sunset Route into these subdivisions for operational purposes:
Yuma Subdivision
Gila Subdivision
Lordsburg Subdivision
Valentine Subdivision
Sanderson Subdivision
Del Rio Subdivision
Glidden Subdivision
Houston Subdivision
Lafayette Subdivision
 Terminal Subdivision

See also

Central Corridor (Union Pacific Railroad)
Southern Transcon

References

Union Pacific Railroad lines
Rail infrastructure in California
Rail infrastructure in Arizona
Rail infrastructure in New Mexico
Rail infrastructure in Texas
Rail infrastructure in Louisiana